Aromatic wines are white wines with dominant  aroma. The best known are riesling, gewürztraminer, viognier, muscat and pinot gris. Torrontés is an aromatic wine.

References

Wine